Jordan Scott may refer to:
 Jordan Scott (filmmaker)
 Jordan Scott (poet)

See also
 Scott Jordan (disambiguation)